Santa Buddies, also known as Santa Buddies: The Legend of Santa Paws, is a 2009 American Christmas comedy film. It is the fourth installment of the Air Buddies spin-off series as well as the ninth film in the Air Bud franchise. It was released on DVD and Blu-ray November 24, 2009. Tom Bosley's appearance in the film was his final role before his death.

Plot
At the North Pole, Santa Claus (George Wendt) and his dog Santa Paws (Tom Bosley), a gentle and loyal all-white Great Pyrenees, go outside to examine the magical Christmas Icicle, which is melting because nobody believes in Christmas anymore; if it continues to melt, Christmas will be gone forever.

After causing mayhem in Santa's workshop and getting exiled for it, Puppy Paws (Zachary Gordon), the fun-loving son of Santa Paws, stares at the Icicle and states "I wish Christmas would just disappear", which causes it to crack. He finds Budderball (Josh Flitter) on Santa's naughty list for eating the Thanksgiving turkey and figures he's just the dog to show him how to be an ordinary puppy. Meanwhile, the Christmas Icicle makes a big crack, shuts off the power at the North Pole, and makes the reindeer weak and powerless.

Budderball and the other Buddies (Field Cate, Liliana Mumy, Skyler Gisondo, Ty Panitz), also lacking in Christmas spirit, believe that their father is Santa Paws in disguise, and that the naughty list is a way to scare them to behave. However, Sniffer (Tim Conway) replies that Christmas is about giving and a holiday they must learn to respect.

Puppy Paws makes it to Fernfield, Washington to find Budderball in his home. Budderball introduces Puppy Paws to his brothers and sister. The North Pole puppy ends up being a nuisance to each of the Buddies: Budderball is framed for eating the shortbread cookies as he tries to get back on the nice list, B-Dawg gets beaten at break dancing by Puppy Paws, who even accidentally breaks a vase, Puppy Paws, unaware not to do so, shakes dirt out of his fur in the living room after Mudbud gives him lessons on how to roll in the dirt, creating holiday shapes of the dirt spots which results in Mudbud being put in a cover-up coat for the rest of the day, Rosebud gets an extreme Christmas makeover, and Buddha's meditation statue is turned into a snowman as Puppy Paws explains that the snowman is "what citizens of the North Pole meditate in front of".

Fed up with Puppy Paws' antics, the Buddies lose their patience and eject him from their house. But they learn that Puppy Paws isn't hurting them as they are hurting themselves and decide to treat him with compassion. Puppy Paws gets taken away by dog catcher Stan Cruge (Christopher Lloyd), who takes him to the pound. There, Puppy Paws meets a puppy named Tiny (Kaitlyn Maher) who is wishing for a Christmas miracle and sings a song about miracles, which teaches Puppy Paws about the true meaning of Christmas.

The Buddies, along with an elf dog named Eddy (Richard Kind), come to the rescue. Eddy tells Cruge that he knows the dog catcher always wanted a puppy for Christmas, but his mother was allergic to dogs and never got one, which made Cruge hate Christmas and become a dog catcher.

With help from an elf named Eli (Danny Woodburn), Christmas spirit returns, the Christmas Icicle stops melting, and the North Pole is back in business. Puppy Paws and the Buddies make it to the North Pole. The reindeer are unable to fly, and Puppy Paws and the Buddies volunteer to save Christmas with their uncanny abilities (the Buddies remembered what Shasta taught them). A changed Mr. Cruge brings Tiny over to the child who has been asking for a puppy as a Christmas present. Tiny says her goodbyes to the Buddies and Puppy Paws. After their last delivery, Santa Claus and Santa Paws arrive in Fernfield. Santa puts the Buddies (including Budderball) on top of the nice list, Puppy Paws becomes part of Santa's family, and the Buddies bid him farewell.

Mr. Cruge is invited to dinner with Tiny's new family. The movie ends with the entire town (including the Buddies and Deputy Sniffer), led by Cruge, singing "Silent Night" in front of Fernfield's Christmas tree.

Cast
George Wendt as Santa Claus
Christopher Lloyd as Stan Cruge
Danny Woodburn as Eli
Quinn Lord as Pete
Ryan Grantham as Sam
Andrew Astor as Mikey
Sophia Ludwig as Alice
Gig Morton as Billy
Craig Anton as Bob
Michael Teigen as Sheriff Dan

Voice cast
Zachary Gordon as Puppy Paws, Santa Paws' son
Tom Bosley as Santa Paws, a Great Pyrenees
Tim Conway as Sniffer
Josh Flitter as Budderball 
Liliana Mumy as Rosebud 
Ty Panitz as Mudbud (Jonathan Morgan Heit when singing)
Field Cate as Buddha 
Skyler Gisondo as B-Dawg 
Richard Kind as Eddy, a Jack Russell Terrier
Kaitlyn Maher as Tiny, a Yorkshire Terrier
Chris Coppola as Comet, a Reindeer
Justin Roiland As Chihuahua (Uncredited)

Sequels
A prequel called The Search for Santa Paws was released on November 23, 2010.

Spooky Buddies was released on September 20, 2011, as a Halloween movie, featuring the Buddies in a new adventure filled with curses, ghosts, and mayhem, and an attempt to stop Warwick the Warlock and the Halloween Hound. Treasure Buddies was released on January 31, 2012, as an Indiana Jones-like movie, featuring the Buddies in another new adventure trying to stop Cleocatra in Egypt.

See also 
 List of Christmas films
 Santa Claus in film

References

External links

Canadian direct-to-video films
2009 direct-to-video films
American direct-to-video films
Canadian sequel films
2000s English-language films
Disney direct-to-video films
Films about dogs
Films about animals playing sports
Direct-to-video sequel films
American Christmas films
Films directed by Robert Vince
Air Bud (series)
2000s American animated films
2000s Christmas films
American sequel films
Canadian Christmas films
2009 films
Santa Claus in film